Eupithecia exheres is a moth in the  family Geometridae. It is found in Madagascar.

References

Moths described in 1954
exheres
Moths of Madagascar